Oranzherei is a rural locality (a selo) and the administrative center of Oranzhereininsky Selsoviet in Ikryaninsky District, Astrakhan Oblast, Russia. The population was 4,473 as of 2010. There are 23 streets.

Geography 
Oranzherei is located 34 km south of Ikryanoye (the district's administrative centre) by road. Sudachye is the nearest rural locality.

References 

Rural localities in Ikryaninsky District